Agridaki is a village in Cyprus, located 1 km east of Larnakas tis Lapithou. Agridaki is under the de facto control of Northern Cyprus. Before the 1974 Turkish invasion of Cyprus, the village was inhabited by Greek Cypriots. They fled before the Turkish forces reached the village. Agridaki is now inhabited by Turkish Cypriots from Paphos District.

Agios Charalampos
The village has a church dating back to 1908. Most of the church interior is now in ruins. In a corner, there is a small iconostasis dedicated to the saint of the church.

References

External links

Communities in Kyrenia District
Populated places in Girne District